Polysorbates are a class of emulsifiers used in some pharmaceuticals and food preparation. They are commonly used in oral and topical pharmaceutical dosage forms. They are also often used in cosmetics to solubilize essential oils into water-based products. Polysorbates are oily liquids derived from ethoxylated sorbitan (a derivative of sorbitol) esterified with fatty acids. Common brand names for polysorbates include Kolliphor, Scattics, Alkest, Canarcel, and Tween.

Examples 
 Polysorbate 20 (polyoxyethylene (20) sorbitan monolaurate) 
 Polysorbate 40 (polyoxyethylene (20) sorbitan monopalmitate) 
 Polysorbate 60 (polyoxyethylene (20) sorbitan monostearate) 
 Polysorbate 80 (polyoxyethylene (20) sorbitan monooleate)

The number following the 'polysorbate' part is related to the type of major fatty acid associated with the molecule. Monolaurate is indicated by 20, monopalmitate is indicated by 40, monostearate by 60, and monooleate by 80. The number 20 following the 'polyoxyethylene' part refers to the total number of oxyethylene (–CH2CH2O–) groups found in the molecule.

See also 
 Sorbitan monolaurate
 Sorbitan monostearate 
 Sorbitan tristearate
 Sorbitan monooleate

References

External links 
 NIH PEG-60 (Polysorbate 60) Household Products Database

Non-ionic surfactants
Food additives
Colloidal chemistry
E-number additives